Eslamiyeh is a city in South Khorasan Province, Iran.

Eslamiyeh may refer also to:
 Eslamiyeh, Fars
 Eslamiyeh, Ilam
 Eslamiyeh, Kerman
 Eslamiyeh, Kermanshah
 Eslamiyeh, Mashhad, Razavi Khorasan Province
 Eslamiyeh, Nishapur, Razavi Khorasan Province
 Eslamiyeh, Yazd
 Eslamiyeh Rural District, in Kerman Province